The big deer mouse (Peromyscus grandis) is a species of rodent in the family Cricetidae. It is found only in Guatemala.

References

Peromyscus
Endemic fauna of Guatemala
Mammals described in 1932
Rodents of Central America
Taxonomy articles created by Polbot